The degrees of Eastern Orthodox and Eastern Catholic monasticism are the stages an Eastern Orthodox monk or nun passes through in their religious vocation.

In the Eastern Orthodox Church, the process of becoming a monk or nun is intentionally slow, as the monastic vows taken are considered to entail a lifelong commitment to God, and are not to be entered into lightly. After a person completes the novitiate, three degrees or steps must be completed in the process of preparation before one may gain the monastic habit.

Orthodox monasticism
Unlike in Western Christianity, where different religious orders and societies arose, each with its own profession rites, the Eastern Orthodox Church has only one type of monasticism. The profession of monastics is known as tonsure (referring to the ritual cutting of the monastic's hair which takes place during the service) and was, at one time, considered to be a Sacred Mystery (sacrament). The Rite of Tonsure is printed in the Euchologion (Church Slavonic: Trebnik), as are the other Sacred Mysteries and services performed according to need, such as funerals, blessings, and exorcisms.

The monastic habit is the same throughout the Eastern Church (with certain slight regional variations), and it is the same for both monks and nuns. Each successive grade is given a portion of the habit, the full habit being worn only by those in the highest grade, known for that reason as the "Great Schema", or "Great Habit". A person may enter any monastery of one's choice; but after being accepted by the abbot (or abbess) and making vows, one may not move from place to place without the blessing of one's ecclesiastical superior. This satisfies the principle of "stability of place", important to monasticism.

One becomes a monk or nun by being tonsured, a rite that only a priest can perform. This is typically done by the abbot. The priest tonsuring a monk or nun must be tonsured into the same or greater degree of monasticism that he is tonsuring another into. In other words, only a hieromonk who has been tonsured into the Great Schema may himself tonsure a Schemamonk. A bishop, however, may tonsure into any rank, regardless of his own. On rare occasions, a bishop will allow a priest to tonsure a monk or nun into any rank.

Eastern Orthodox monks are addressed as "Father", as are priests and deacons in the Orthodox Church. When conversing among themselves, monks in some places may address one another as "Brother". Novices are most often referred to as "Brother", although at some places, e.g., on Mount Athos, novices are addressed as "Father". Among the Greeks, old monks are often called Gheronda, or "Elder", out of respect for their dedication. In the Slavic tradition, the title of Elder (Church Slavonic: старецъ, Starets) is normally reserved for those who are of an advanced spiritual life, and who serve as guides for others.

Nuns who have been tonsured to the Stavrophore or higher are addressed as "Mother". Novice and Rassophore nuns are addressed as "Sister". Nuns live ascetic lives that are identical to those of their male counterparts and are therefore also called monachai (the feminine plural of monachos). Their community is likewise called a monastery.

Monks who have been ordained to the priesthood are called hieromonks (priest-monks); monks who have been ordained to the diaconate are called hierodeacons (deacon-monks). A Schemamonk who is a priest is called a Hieroschemamonk. Most monks are not ordained; a community will normally only present as many candidates for ordination to the bishop as the liturgical needs of the community require. Bishops are required by the sacred canons of the Orthodox Church to be chosen from among the monastic clergy, who do not marry.

Today, the most important centres of Christian Orthodox monasticism are Saint Catherine's Monastery in the Sinai Peninsula (Egypt), Meteora at Thessaly in Greece, Mount Athos in Greek Macedonia, Mar Saba in the Bethlehem Governorate of the West Bank, and the Monastery of Saint John the Theologian on the island of Patmos in Greece.

Degrees

Novice
Novice (Greek: δόκιμος, dókimos; Church Slavonic: послушникъ, poslushnik), lit. "one under obedience"—Those wishing to join a monastery begin their lives as novices. After the candidate comes to the monastery and lives as a guest for not less than three days, the abbot or abbess may bless the candidate to become a novice. There is no formal ceremony for the clothing of a novice; he or she simply receives permission to wear the clothing of a novice. In the Eastern monastic tradition, novices may or may not dress in the black inner cassock (Church Slavonic: Podriasnik) and wear the soft monastic hat (Greek: Skoufos, Church Slavonic: Skufia), depending on the tradition of the local community, and in accordance with the abbot’s directives. In some communities, the novice also wears the leather belt. Monks are given a prayer rope and instructed in the use of the Jesus Prayer.

If a novice chooses to leave during the period of the novitiate, no penalty is incurred. He may also be asked to leave at any time if his behaviour does not conform to the monastic life, or if the superior discerns that he is not called to monasticism. When the abbot or abbess deems the novice ready, he is asked if he wishes to join the monastery. Some, out of humility, will choose to remain novices all their lives. Every stage of the monastic life must be entered into voluntarily.

Rasophore
Rasophore (Greek: ῥασοφόρος, rasophoros; Church Slavonic: рясофоръ, ryasofor), lit. "Robe-bearer"—If the novice continues to become a monk, he is clothed in the first degree of monasticism at a service at which he receives the tonsure. Although there are no formal vows made at this point, the candidate is normally required to affirm his commitment to persevere in the monastic life. The abbot performs the tonsure, cutting a small amount of hair from four spots on the head, forming a cross. The novice is given the outer cassock (Greek: ράσον, Rasson, Exorasson, or Mandorrason; Church Slavonic: рясса, Riassa), an outer robe with wide sleeves, from which the name of Rassophore is derived. He is also given a kalimavkion, a cylindrical brimless hat, which is covered with a veil called an epanokalimavkion. (These are separate items in the Greek tradition. In the Russian tradition the two are stitched together and collectively called a klobuk.) If the novice has not previously received it, a leather belt is fastened around his waist. His habit is usually black, signifying that he is now dead to the world, and he receives a new name.

Although the Rassophore does not make formal vows, he is morally obligated to continue in the monastic estate for the rest of his life. Some will remain Rassophores permanently without going on to the higher degrees.

Stavrophore
Stavrophore (Greek: σταυρoφόρος, stavrophoros; Church Slavonic: крестоносецъ, krestonosets), lit. "Cross-bearer"—The next level for Eastern monastics takes place some years after the first tonsure, when the abbot feels the monk has reached an appropriate level of discipline, dedication, and humility. This degree is also known as the Little Schema or Lesser schema, and is thought of as a "betrothal" to the Great Schema. At this stage, the monk makes formal vows of stability of place, chastity, obedience and poverty.

Then he is tonsured and clothed in the habit, which in addition to that worn by the Rassophore, includes the paramandyas (Greek: παραμανδυας; Church Slavonic: параманъ, paraman), a piece of square cloth worn on the back, embroidered with the instruments of the Passion, and connected by ties to a wooden cross worn over the heart. The paramandyas represents the yoke of Christ. Because of this addition, he is now called Stavrophore, or Cross-bearer. He is also given a wooden hand cross (or "profession cross"), which he should keep in his icon corner, and a beeswax candle, symbolic of monastic vigilance and sacrificing himself for God. At his death, the monk will be buried holding the cross, and the candle will be burned at his funeral. In the Slavic practice, the Stavrophore also wears the monastic mantle, which symbolizes the 40 days of the Lord's fasting on the Mountain of Temptation. The rasson worn by the Stavrophore is more ample than that worn by the Rassophore.

After the ceremony, the newly tonsured Stavrophore will remain in vigil in the church for five days, refraining from all work, except spiritual reading. In the early 21st century, this vigil is often reduced to three days. The abbot increases the Stavrophore monk’s prayer rule, allows a more strict, personal ascetic practice, and gives the monk more responsibility.

Great Schema

Great Schema (megaloschemos; Church Slavonic: Схима, Schima)—Monks whose abbots feel they have reached a high level of spiritual excellence reach the final stage, called the Great Schema. The tonsure of a Schemamonk or Schemanun follows the same format as the Stavrophore, and he makes the same vows and is tonsured in the same manner. But in addition to all the garments worn by the Stavrophore, he is given the analavos (Church Slavonic: analav), which is the article of monastic vesture emblematic of the Great Schema. The analavos itself is sometimes called the "Great Schema". It drapes over the shoulders and hangs down in front and in back, with the front portion somewhat longer, and is embroidered with the instruments of the Passion and the Trisagion.

The Greek form does not have a hood, but the Slavic form has a hood and lappets on the shoulders, so that the garment forms a large cross covering the monk's shoulders, chest, and back. Another piece added is the polystavrion (πολυσταύριον, "many crosses"), which consists of a cord with a number of small crosses plaited into it.  The polystavrion forms a yoke around the monk and serves to hold the analavos in place. It also reminds the monastic that he is bound to Christ and that his arms are no longer fit for worldly activities, but that he must labor only for the Kingdom of Heaven. Among the Greeks, the mantle is added at this stage. The paramandyas of the Megaloschemos is larger than that of the Stavrophore. If the monk wears the klobuk, it is of a distinctive thimble shape, called a koukoulion, the veil of which is usually embroidered with crosses.

The Schemamonk shall remain some days in vigil in the church. On the eighth day after Tonsure, there is a special service for the "Removal of the Koukoulion".

In some monastic traditions the Great Schema is never given, or is given to monks and nuns only on their death bed. In others, for instance, the cenobitic monasteries on Mount Athos, it is common to tonsure a monastic into the Great Schema 3 years after the candidate commences the monastic life.

In Russian and some other traditions, when a bearer of some monastic title acquires the Great Schema, his title incorporates the word "schema". For example, a hieromonk of Great Schema is called hieroschemamonk, archimandrite becomes schema-archimandrite, hegumen - schema-hegumen, etc. In the Russian Orthodox tradition, in such cases the part "schema" is commonly truncated to "схи" (sche), and correspondingly the titles are spelt as схимонах (schemonach), иеросхимонах (ieroschemonach), схиархимандрит (schearchimandrit), and схиигумен (scheigumen).

Symbolism on Analavos 
Repeated symbols are commonly used on the analavos, the distinctive garment worn by monks that have reached the Great Schema to reference religious imagery, biblical stories, lessons and devotion to Christ. Symbols include: a rooster representing the denial of Peter. A pillar for the column that Pontius Pilate bound Christ to, the wreath for the crown of thorns, the uprate post and transverse beam represent the patibulum. Four spikes for the nails of the cross. The skull and crossbones represents the Adamah, or the returning to the ground at death of Adam and all humankind. The plaque represents the initialism Jesus, King of the Jews. The reed for the Holy Sponge, the Holy Lance. Ladders and pincers under the base for Joseph of Arimathea lowering the body and descending Christ. The central object is often the cross of Christ.

Coptic Orthodox monastic degrees
In the Coptic Church, there are only two degrees of professed monks. These correspond to the Rassaphore combined with the Stavrophore, and the Great Schema (nothing equivalent to separate Stavrophore status in the Coptic tradition).

The two rites of Rasaphore and Stavrophore are served one immediately following the other, as a single service. In the 21st century, they are usually not separated by several years between attainment of these degrees. When the two rites are separated, the portions of the habit that were given in the previous rite are not given a second time in the latter rite.

The Great Schema is made of a leather cord twisted in design and has five to seven small crosses along its length. It is worn crosswise around the neck, flowing down cross wise front and back. It is usually granted to bishops either upon their episcopal consecration or shortly afterwards. It is also usually granted to a monk who has reached a high degree of asceticism or has been living as a hermit. It may also be granted to the monks, hieromonks, and abbots who have been in the monastic life for more than 30 years, and have been living exemplary monastic lives.

See also

Acoemetae
Christian monasticism
Monastery of Stoudios

References

External links
History of monasticism in Russia
Vows of Great Schema a portion of the Tonsure service
Tonsure of a Schemanun Novo-Tikhvin Monastery, Ekaterinburg, Russia
Great Angelic Schema Russian Orthodox (Moscow Patriarchate)
Paraman Russian Orthodox (Photo)
Skufia for Schemamonk (Photo)
Embroidered Greek Great Schema (megaloschema) (Photo)

Christian monasticism
Asceticism
Hesychasm
Eastern Orthodox liturgy
Russian Orthodox monks